The German Cup  is the national ice hockey cup competition in Germany. It was first contested in 2003.

Champions
2003 : Adler Mannheim
2004 : Kölner Haie
2005 : ERC Ingolstadt
2006 : DEG Metro Stars
2007 : Adler Mannheim
2008 : Eisbären Berlin
2009 : Grizzly Adams Wolfsburg
2010 : EHC München
2011 : Starbulls Rosenheim
2012 : Bietigheim Steelers
2013 : Bietigheim Steelers

External links
 DEB-Pokal Website

National ice hockey cup competitions in Europe
Cup